Helichrysum calvertianum is a species of flowering plant in the family Asteraceae. It is a small subshrub with small crowded leaves and single white daisy-like flowers. It is endemic to the Southern Highlands in New South Wales.

Description
The bracts are scaly, brownish, somewhat hairy near the base, intermediate bracts longer with pale, papery edges, sometimes tinted pink near the apex, outer bracts golden and translucent, innermost bracts narrow with small, papery white edges. Flowering occurs from January to August and the fruit are a dry, one-seeded, slightly glandular, oblong to needle-shaped, bristly and almost feathery at the tip.

Taxonomy and naming
Helichrysum calvertianum was first formally described 1877 by Ferdinand von Mueller as Helipterum calvertianum and the description was published in Fragmenta Phytographiae Australiae. In 1882 Mueller changed the name to Helichrysum calvertianum. The specific epithet (calvertianum) is in honour of "Mrs Calvert" (nee Louisa Atkinson), a plant collector for Mueller.

Distribution and habitat
This species grows mostly on Hawkesbury sandstone in heavier, moist soils, on or near rock platforms and in dry sclerophyll forest. It is restricted to the Southern Highlands between Joadja, Belanglo, Fitzroy Falls and Mount Gibraltar.

Conservation status
Helichrysum calvertianum is classified as a "vulnerable species" in New South Wales.

References

calvertianum
Asterales of Australia
Flora of New South Wales